The surname Imre may refer to:

Peter Imre (1962–2022), Romanian businessman
Sándor Imre (1877–1945), Hungarian educator and briefly Minister of Religion and Education of Hungary
Vilmos Imre (born 1968), Hungarian handball coach and former player

See also
Imre, a given name
Emre (surname), a Turkish surname